Anchor Island is an island located within Coronation Gulf, south of Victoria Island, in the Kitikmeot Region, Nunavut, Canada.

Other islands in the vicinity include Duke of York Archipelago, Haodlon Island, Hatoayok Island, Hokagon Island, Kabviukvik Island, Kingak Island, Mangak Island, Nanortut Island, Nanukton Island, Takhoalok Island, as well as the Aiyohok Islands, Akvitlak Islands, Black Berry Islands, Home Islands, Lawford Islands, Miles Islands, Nauyan Islands, and Outcast Islands.

References

 Anchor Island #7 at the Atlas of Canada

Islands of Coronation Gulf
Uninhabited islands of Kitikmeot Region